Jadwiga Łopata, is an organic farmer living near Cracow, Poland. She was awarded the Goldman Environmental Prize in 2002, for her works on rural protection. She is co-founder and co-director of the International Coalition to Protect the Polish Countryside (ICPPC).

Łopata was awarded the Polish Cross of Merit in 2009.

References

External links 
INTERNATIONAL COALITION TO PROTECT THE POLISH COUNTRYSIDE ; MIĘDZYNARODOWA KOALICJA DLA OCHRONY POLSKIEJ WSI

Polish environmentalists
Polish women environmentalists
Year of birth missing (living people)
Living people
Organic farmers
Goldman Environmental Prize awardees